Gheorghe Brăescu (30 January 1871, Iaşi - 15 March 1949) was a Romanian writer.

Works

Sketches
 Vine doamna şi domnul gheneral, 1919
 Maiorul Boţan, 1921 
 Cum sunt ei, 1922
 Schiţe umoristice, 1922
 Doi vulpoi, 1923
 Schiţe vesele, 1924
 Nuvele, 1924
 Un scos din pepeni, 1926
 Schiţe alese, 1927
 Alte schiţe vesele, 1928
 La clubul decavaţilor, 1929

Novels
 Moş Belea, 1927
 Conaşii, 1935
 Primii şi ultimii paşi, 1939
 Margot, 1942

Theatre
 Ministrul

Memoirs
 Amintiri, 1939

Miscellaneous
 Educaţiunea socială a naţiunii armate, 1914

References

Writers from Iași
1871 births
1949 deaths